Basu Poribar may refer to:

 Basu Poribar (1952 film), a Bengali film
 Basu Poribar (2019 film), a Bengali film